Lenco may refer to:

Lenco Turntables, an audio equipment company
Lenco BearCat, an armored assault vehicle made by Lenco Industries